Suffering Luna is an American hardcore punk band based in Los Angeles, California, United States. They are notable for their early contributions to the punk subgenre known as powerviolence and their split releases with Dystopia and Gasp. The band has existed since the early 1990s. Their music is a blend of crust and powerviolence with neo-psychedelia and noise. The inclusion of noise in their sound has led to comparisons with fellow pioneering powerviolence band Man is the Bastard/Bastard Noise.

Personnel

Current lineup
"Messee" – vocals
Sean Socco (Scalplock, Our Scars are Gifts) – guitar, vocals, electronics
Patrick Palma (Magnolia Thunderpussy, Melic Sub Rosa, Pipsqueak) – drums
Mathias Alderaan Derecha (Spirit of Hate, Cave State, Fractured) – bass, electronics
Dustin Johnston (Actuary, To the Point, Fractured) - electronics

Former members
Mitch Brown (Gasp) – drums, electronics
Joe Lara – guitar
"Taz" – bass, vocals
Fivel Perez (Runamuck) - bass, vocals
"Junior" – drums
Sean Cole (F.Y.P., Toys That Kill) – drums

Discography

Albums
Self Titled CD/LP (2011 To Live a Lie Records)

EPs
Blood Filled Bong Cassette (2012 To Live a Lie Records)

Splits
Suffering Luna/Dystopia 7" (1995 Pessimiser Records, reissued on Life Is Abuse/Misanthropic Records)
Suffering Luna/Gasp LP (1996 Deep Six Records)
Suffering Luna/Suffer the Storm LP (2014 King of the Monsters Records)
Suffering Luna/Column of Heaven LP (2016 Nerve Altar Records)

References

External links 
 Suffering Luna Homepage

Hardcore punk groups from California
American experimental musical groups
Powerviolence groups
American crust and d-beat groups
American sludge metal musical groups
Noise musical groups